Kafr Aqid is a Syrian village located in the Masyaf Subdistrict in Masyaf District, located west of Hama. According to the Syria Central Bureau of Statistics (CBS), Kafr Aqid had a population of 1,373 in the 2004 census.

References 

Populated places in Masyaf District